Victoriana is a genus of hoverflies in the family Syrphidae. This genus, corresponding to the former Ocyptamus melanorrhinus species group, is currently divided into three species groups: V. attenuata, V. melanorrhina and V. parvicornis species groups.

Species list 
Victoriana has 3 species groups.
 Victoriana attenuata (Williston, 1891)
 Victoriana melanorrhina (Philippi, 1865) 
 Victoriana parvicornis (Loew, 1861)

References 

Syrphini
Syrphoidea genera